Harry Bauchman (June 6, 1890 – June 20, 1931), nicknamed "Pick", was an American Negro league infielder between 1911 and 1921.

A native of Omaha, Nebraska, Bauchman made his Negro leagues debut in 1911 with the Minneapolis Keystones. He went on to play for several teams, finishing his career with a three-year stint with the Chicago Giants from 1919 to 1921. Bauchman died in Chicago, Illinois in 1931 at age 41.

References

External links
 and Baseball-Reference Black Baseball stats and Seamheads

1890 births
1931 deaths
Chicago American Giants players
Chicago Giants players
Minneapolis Keystones players
San Francisco Park players
St. Louis Giants players
Baseball players from Nebraska
Sportspeople from Omaha, Nebraska
American expatriate baseball players in Cuba
20th-century African-American sportspeople
Baseball infielders